The 2018 season was the San Francisco 49ers' 69th in the National Football League, their 73rd overall, their fifth playing their home games at Levi's Stadium and their second under the head coach/general manager tandem of Kyle Shanahan and John Lynch.

After finishing 6–10 from an 0–9 start the previous year, the 49ers were looking to improve from that record and make the playoffs for the first time since 2013. However, the 49ers' season ended with a record of 4–12 and were plagued by multiple season-ending injuries, which have included RB Jerick McKinnon tearing his ACL in training camp and QB Jimmy Garoppolo also tearing his ACL in Week 3 against the Kansas City Chiefs. The 49ers were eliminated from playoff contention following a Week 13 loss to the Seattle Seahawks. In Week 15, however, the 49ers upset the Seahawks 26–23 in overtime at home, snapping the 49ers' 10–game losing streak to them that dated back to 2013 Playoffs. The win also stopped the Seahawks from clinching a playoff spot that week. The 49ers failed to improve on their 6–10 record from last year. The 49ers also went 0–8 on the road for the first time since 1979.

The 49ers defense would also go on to set multiple NFL records for futility. During the entire 16 game schedule of the 2018 NFL season, the 49ers defense would accumulate just two interceptions, breaking the previous mark of three. Incredibly, that included strike shortened NFL seasons. Putting that into perspective, a total of 40 different players throughout the league would go on to have more interceptions than the entire 49ers team. The 49ers would also have just seven total takeaways on the season, smashing the previous record of 11.  The 49ers were also last in the league with a −25 turnover differential, the worst mark since 2008.

The 2018 49ers would go on to set one more notable "futility" mark after the team went 8–0 to start the following season, thus giving the 2018 49ers the worst record in NFL history of any team that went on to go undefeated that far into the following season.

Offseason

Roster changes

Free agency
The 49ers entered free agency with the following:

Signings

Departures

Draft

Notes
 The 49ers finished with the same overall record and strength of schedule as the Oakland Raiders at the end of the  season, and their selecting order was determined by way of a coin flip at the NFL Scouting Combine in early 2018. Both teams will then rotate with the Miami Dolphins, selecting 9th, 10th and 11th in each round. The 49ers won the coin toss.

Draft trades
 The 49ers traded a second-round selection (43rd overall) to New England in exchange for quarterback Jimmy Garoppolo.
 The 49ers traded their third-round selection in 2017 (67th overall) to New Orleans in exchange for New Orleans' second-round selection (59th overall) and their seventh-round selection in 2017 (229th overall).
 The 49ers traded their first-round selection in 2017 (2nd overall) to Chicago in exchange for Chicago's third-round selection (70th overall), and their first-, third- and fourth-round selections in 2017 (3rd, 67th and 111th overall).
 The 49ers traded their fourth-round selection (109th overall) to Denver in exchange for Denver's fifth-round selection in 2017 (177th overall) and running back Kapri Bibbs.
 The 49ers traded their fifth-round selection (148th overall) and tight end Vance McDonald to Pittsburgh in exchange for Pittsburgh's fourth-round selection (128th overall).
 The 49ers traded cornerback Rashard Robinson to the New York Jets in exchange for the Jets' fifth-round selection (143rd overall).
 The 49ers traded their seventh-round selection (227th overall) and center Daniel Kilgore to Miami in exchange for the seventh-round selection Miami acquired from Tampa Bay (223rd overall).
 The 49ers traded cornerback Kenneth Acker to Kansas City in exchange for Kansas City's seventh-round selection (240th overall).
 The 49ers traded their fifth-round selection (143rd overall) and OT Trent Brown to New England in exchange for the third-round selection (95th overall).

Undrafted free agents

Staff

Final roster

Preseason

Regular season

Schedule

Game summaries

Week 1: at Minnesota Vikings

Three interceptions by Jimmy Garoppolo, who earned his first loss as an NFL starter, would hurt the 49ers in the end. The 49ers lost 24–16, with the difference being a Garoppolo pick-six as well several key drops by receivers.

Week 2: vs. Detroit Lions
 Despite the Lions' attempted comeback in the fourth quarter, the 49ers would hang on to win 30-27 as the team earns their first win of the season behind 2 TDs from Garoppolo and Matt Breida's 138 yards rushing.

Week 3: at Kansas City Chiefs
 Not only did the 49ers lose the game, Jimmy Garoppolo got carted off in the fourth quarter with a serious knee injury. The next day, an MRI further revealed that Garoppolo had torn his ACL, ruling him out for the rest of the season.

These two teams would meet again the following season in Super Bowl LIV, with the 49ers falling short 31–20.

Week 4: at Los Angeles Chargers

The first post-Garoppolo game of the season was a surprisingly competitive game, mostly due to safety Antone Exum getting a pick-six in the first quarter, but the 49ers still lost 29–27 and dropped to 1–3 on the season and 0–1 after Garoppolo's injury.

Week 5: vs. Arizona Cardinals

Playing a winless Cardinals team desperately seeking a win, the 49ers held rookie QB Josh Rosen in check, but were hurt by five offensive turnovers, one of which resulted in a defensive touchdown for Arizona. The 49ers drop to 1–4 (0–2 since Garoppolo's injury) heading into a Monday Night road game against the Packers.

Week 6: at Green Bay Packers

The 49ers held a 30–23 lead in the final three minutes, but Aaron Rodgers threw a touchdown pass to Davante Adams to tie the game with less than 2 minutes left. On the 49ers' next drive, a critical C. J. Beathard interception plus an illegal contact penalty on Richard Sherman in the final minute led to a 27-yard game-winning field goal by Mason Crosby to send the 49ers to a 33–30 loss and a 1–5 record heading into next week's home game against the undefeated Rams.

Week 7: vs. Los Angeles Rams

Week 8: at Arizona Cardinals

With the loss, the Niners dropped to 1–7 and last place in the NFC West. They were also swept by the Cardinals for the 4th consecutive year.

Week 9: vs. Oakland Raiders

This was the first start for Nick Mullens at QB, who replaced C. J. Beathard. The game was incredibly one-sided, with the 49ers winning by over 30 points.

Week 10: vs. New York Giants

Week 12: at Tampa Bay Buccaneers

Week 13: at Seattle Seahawks

Week 14: vs. Denver Broncos

Week 15: vs. Seattle Seahawks

This was the first time since 2013 that the 49ers beat the Seahawks, snapping a 10-game losing streak which dates back to the 2013-14 NFC Championship Game. This also prevented the Seahawks from clinching a Wild-Card Berth that week.

Week 16: vs. Chicago Bears

Week 17: at Los Angeles Rams

With the loss, the 49ers finished 0–8 on the road for the first time since 1979.

Standings

Division

Conference

References

External links

 
 

San Francisco
San Francisco 49ers seasons
San Francisco 49ers